Photoscotosia insularis is a species of moth of the family Geometridae first described by Max Bastelberger in 1909. It is found in Taiwan.

The wingspan is 40–50 mm.

References

Moths described in 1909
Larentiini